"The Angel Song" is a song by American glam metal band Great White, released as a single in 1989.

Charts

References 

Great White songs
1989 songs